Los Hermanos de la Fraternidad Piadosa de Nuestro Padre Jesús Nazareno (Spanish: 'The Brothers of the Pious Fraternity of Our Father Jesus the Nazarene'), also known as Los Penitentes, Los Hermanos, the Brotherhood of our Father Jesus of Nazareth and the Penitente Brotherhood is a lay confraternity of Spanish-American Catholic men active in Northern and Central New Mexico and southern Colorado. They maintain religious meeting buildings, which are not formal churches, called .

Membership
Although there is great variability regarding candidacy for Brotherhood membership, usually novices come from Penitente families and ideally, only those of known background and conviction are chosen to undergo the initiation. After a thorough investigation of the petitioner's life and motives, he receives elaborate instruction in the Brotherhood's regulations and rituals. If he passes an examination on this material, he is allowed to present himself, together with a sponsor, at the  door for the actual rite of initiation. It is also thought that the eldest son of a Penitente father "automatically" joined the Brotherhood at the age of eighteen to honor and obey his parents.

History

The Brotherhood began in the early 19th century.  Following Mexican independence from Spain in 1821, Church authorities in Mexico withdrew the Franciscan, Dominican and Jesuit missionaries from its provinces, replacing them with secular priests.  They failed, however, to replace the missionaries with an equal number of priests, depriving many secluded communities of a resident clergyman.  Accordingly, many of those small communities could expect only a once-yearly visit from a parish priest.

The men in those communities eventually came together in the absence of a priest and dedicated themselves to the purpose of providing mutual aid, community charity and to memorialize the spirit of the penance and the Passion of Christ. Los Penitentes were perhaps best known for their songs of worship, called , and for their ascetic practices, which included self-flagellation in private ceremonies during Lent, and processions during Holy Week which ended with the reenactment of Christ’s crucifixion on Good Friday.  

Archbishop Jean Baptiste Lamy and his successor, Jean Baptiste Salpointe, unsuccessfully attempted to suppress the brotherhood in the latter part of the 19th century as a part of the "Americanization" of the Church in New Mexico, driving its membership underground, with some seeking refuge in Penitente Canyon. For this reason, Los Penitentes are sometimes described as a “secret society.”

The modern embodiment of the Brotherhood began in the middle of the 20th century with the reconciliation between the Brotherhood and the Church.  In June 1946, Miguel Archibeque began his first term as the Brotherhood's first Hermano Supremo Arzobispal (Archiepiscopal Supreme Brother).  His first term lasted 7 years and it was during this term in January 1947 that the Brotherhood was officially recognized and sanctioned as an organization by Archbishop Edwin V. Byrne.  By this time, membership had declined markedly since the turn of the century, but the Brotherhood continued to perform a modified form of religious rituals and to pursue its commitment to acts of community charity. In June 1953, Miguel Archibeque was replaced by Roman Aranda of Las Vegas, New Mexico.  Aranda served for one year and was replaced by Archibeque in June 1954.  Archibeque served the Brotherhood until 1960 when he was replaced by the third Hermano Supremo Arzobispal, M. Santos Melendez, of Mora, New Mexico, who continues to serve in this capacity.

Culture
Willa Cather's 1927 novel Death Comes for the Archbishop included references and scenes of the Penitentes and their ritual.

In the novel Brave New World, the Penitentes are shown in a video at a school, which causes the class to laugh at their rituals. They are also compared to savages in the 1946 foreword by Aldous Huxley.

The 1936 roadshow exploitation film Lash of the Penitentes combines old footage of the Penitente's ritual flagellation with new footage about a murder.
 	
The novel Dayspring (1945) by Harry Sylvester depicts an anthropologist who studies the Penitentes and eventually joins them.

Fray Angelico Chavez titled his book on New Mexico My Penitente Land.

Percival Everett’s novel The Body of Martin Aguilera (1997) features Penitente characters and rituals as part of a murder mystery set in northern New Mexico. Everett also utilizes Penitente characters for his short story "Warm and Nicely Buried" from his collection Damned If I Do (2004).

See also
 Flagellant confraternities
Order of Penitents
La Morada de Nuestra Senora de Guadalupe, Taos, New Mexico

References

Further reading
 De Aragon, Ray John. The Penitentes of New Mexico (Sunstone Press, 2006).
 Aranda, Charles (1974) The Penitente Papers.
 Carroll, Michael P. The Penitente Brotherhood: Patriarchy and Hispano-Catholicism in New Mexico (Johns Hopkins University Press, 2002).
 Chavez, Fray Angelico. "The Penitentes of New Mexico." New Mexico Historical Review 29.2 (1954): 97.
 Espinosa, J. Manuel. "The origin of the penitentes of New Mexico: separating fact from fiction." Catholic historical review 79#3 (1993): 454-477. in JSTOR
 Weigle, Marta. Brothers of Light, Brothers of Blood (2007).

External links
Los Hermanos Penitentes at the Catholic Encyclopedia

Catholic lay organisations
Confraternities
History of Catholicism in the United States
Mexican-American organizations
New Mexico culture
Secret societies in the United States
Spanish-American culture in Colorado
Spanish-American culture in New Mexico